Jazz By Sun Ra (later titled Sun Song) is the debut album by Sun Ra. The record label for the first pressing says "07-12-56", presumably when it was recorded.  The LP originally appeared on Tom Wilson's short-lived Transition Records. In the mid-1960s it was purchased (along with much of the Transition catalog) by Delmark Records owner Bob Koester, finally being reissued in 1967.

When originally released, it came with an extensive booklet featuring words and photos of Sun Ra and his Arkestra.  The LP featured original compositions by Sun Ra along with one by Arkestral bassist Richard Evans.  Another composition by Arkestra member Julian Priester has been included in reissues from the session, and additional unreleased tracks (all Ra originals) are known to survive.  The single non-Arkestral composition was Possession, by Harry Revel, which had been written for Les Baxter's album Perfume Set to Music; Possession was arranged for the Arkestra by the Texan pianist and composer Prince Shell.

Earlier home recordings by Ra, including one dating from 1948 or 1949, were released with tracks from 1973 on the album Deep Purple.

Track listing

When reissued on Compact Disc in 1991, "Swing a Little Taste" was added. This was originally released on the Transition sampler Jazz in Transition alongside tracks by artists such as Cecil Taylor, Donald Byrd and John Coltrane.

CD version
"Brainville" (Sun Ra) 4:29
"Call for all Demons" (Sun Ra) 4:30
"Transition" (Sun Ra) 3:40
"Possession" (Harry Revel) 5:00
"Street Named Hell" (Sun Ra) 3:55
"Lullaby for Realville" (Richard Evans) 4:40
"Future" (Sun Ra) 3:15
"Swing a Little Taste" (Sun Ra) 4:25
"New Horizons" (Sun Ra) 3:05
"Fall off the Log" (Sun Ra) 4:00
"Sun Song" (Sun Ra) 3:40

Musicians 
Sun Ra - Piano, Hammond B-3 organ, Percussion
Art Hoyle - Trumpet, Percussion
Dave Young - Trumpet, Percussion
Julian Priester - Trombone, Percussion
James Scales - Alto Sax
John Gilmore - Tenor sax, Percussion
Pat Patrick - Baritone Sax, Percussion
Richard Evans - Bass
Wilburn Green - Electric Bass, Percussion
Robert Barry - Drums
Jim Herndon - Tympani

Recorded Universal Recording, Chicago, July 12, 1956

Pressings

External sources
Complete Sun Ra Discography

References

Sun Ra albums
1957 debut albums
Albums produced by Tom Wilson (record producer)
Delmark Records albums
Transition Records albums